Malwande Zamo (born 9 January 1997) is a South African cricketer. He made his first-class debut for Border in the 2017–18 Sunfoil 3-Day Cup on 22 March 2018. He made his List A debut for Border in the 2017–18 CSA Provincial One-Day Challenge on 25 March 2018.

References

External links
 

1997 births
Living people
South African cricketers
Border cricketers
Place of birth missing (living people)